Nishan Peiris (born 11 August 1997) is a Sri Lankan cricketer.

Domestic career
He made his first-class debut for Badureliya Sports Club in the 2015–16 Premier League Tournament on 19 February 2016. He made his Twenty20 debut for Ragama Cricket Club in the 2017–18 SLC Twenty20 Tournament on 24 February 2018. He made his List A debut for Ragama Cricket Club in the 2017–18 Premier Limited Overs Tournament on 11 March 2018.

In March 2018, he was named in Galle's squad for the 2017–18 Super Four Provincial Tournament. The following month, he was also named in Galle's squad for the 2018 Super Provincial One Day Tournament. In August 2018, he was named in Galle's squad the 2018 SLC T20 League. He was the leading wicket-taker in the 2018–19 Premier Limited Overs Tournament, with 20 dismissals in six matches.

In March 2019, he was named in Galle's squad for the 2019 Super Provincial One Day Tournament.

International career
In August 2018, Sri Lanka Cricket named him in a preliminary squad of 31 players for the 2018 Asia Cup. In November 2018, he was added to Sri Lanka's squad for the third Test against England. In December 2018, he was named in Sri Lanka team for the 2018 ACC Emerging Teams Asia Cup.

References

External links
 

1997 births
Living people
Sri Lankan cricketers
Badureliya Sports Club cricketers
Ragama Cricket Club cricketers
People from Negombo